The UBC Farm is a 24-hectare farm, and forest system, on the southern end of the University of British Columbia (UBC) campus in Vancouver, British Columbia, Canada. The farm is operated by the Centre for Sustainable Food Systems, which is part of the Faculty of Land and Food Systems, and has existed in its current form since 2000. It hosts a variety of crops and fruits, as well as some animals and composting facilities. Several academic programs allow the students to use the farm for research and teaching.

History 

The farm, located on traditional Musqueam First Nations territory, has been a part of UBC since 1915. However, the farm of 1915 was not located at its current location, but reached from the Nitobe Memorial Garden to the Thunderbird Stadium. In 1970 the farm moved closer to its current location at Wesbrook Place. During the 1990s, activity on the agricultural area at the south end of campus declined, and in 1997 the area was declared a Future Housing Reserve. A student-initiated program, supported by the Faculties of Science and Forestry, began in 1999 to advocate for the revival of the UBC Farm. During the year 2008, there was an announcement of plans to reduce the size of the farm or move it somewhere else. This caused the Alma Mater Society club Friends of the UBC Farm to start the "Save the Farm" campaign, and advocate for the conservation of the farm. This campaign caused a shift in policy, and on December 1, 2009, UBC's Board of Governors stated that the site of the UBC Farm would no longer be considered a housing reserve. In 2011, the area was declared a "Green Academic" zone, which "will be kept primarily as open areas to support land-based teaching, research and community engagement".

Farm facilities and mission

Farm facilities 

The farm consists of two small buildings, which can serve a variety of purposes, including as classroom, office, kitchen, storage, and processing areas, and it is surrounded by a coastal hemlock forest. Two tractors and other tools are stored in several sheds on site, and two glass greenhouses and three polytunnels offer to extend the seasons and further spread the crops. A 300 m3 composting facility can process the farm's and other local produce wholesalers' organic waste and turn it into soil fertilizer. Two trailers offer staff accommodation to take care of the animals 24 hours a day. The farm includes a wide range of crops and livestock, which represent the agricultural possibilities of the Pacific northwest. Vancouver's moderate maritime climate allows cultivation of certain crops year round. Over 70 different kind of apples grow in the heritage orchard, and the farm also features grapes, blueberries, raspberries, hops, and truffles. The farm normally hosts some free-range poultry and honeybee colonies, and has occasionally been a seasonal home for cattle. It provides a habitat for "a range of birds, mammals, amphibians, and reptiles not found elsewhere in the city".

Farm mission 

The farm's objective is to offer UBC a wider arrange of possibilities to research and create more sustainable and healthy communities through interdisciplinary cooperation and hands-on learning. It aims to promote a better understanding of the relationship between society and ecological systems. Through sharing knowledge with the local community, it raises awareness about a healthy and sustainable lifestyle.

Farmers' markets and other events 

From June through October, UBC Farm offers two farmers' markets every week, where farm produce is sold. On Saturdays, the market is held at the UBC Farm, and on Wednesdays the produce is sold at UBC's Vancouver campus. Some produce is also sold to local restaurants, and a volunteer student organization provides a delivery service of the farm's produce. The farm occasionally hosts private events like weddings, birthday parties, and music events.

Teaching programs

Curricular activities 

UBC Farm provides students with resources to pursue land-based, hands-on research and learning. Several UBC degree programs cooperate with the farm, in particular the Faculty of Land and Foods Systems, and include the farm in many of their curricular activities. In 2010, 2,500 students from eight faculties participated in curricular activities based at the farm. The farm is also part of UBC's Campus as Living Lab initiative, which was introduced with UBC's commitment to sustainability.

Indigenous teaching 

As part of Vancouver's Native Health Society (VNHS) project, a garden and a weekly community kitchen for Aboriginal people in Vancouver was established in 2005. The goal is to provide healthy food for Aboriginal people and to give elderly and young Aboriginals a space to interact and share knowledge. The native Musqueam community has a space to grow food and medicinal plants.

Children's Learning Garden 

The farm also features a Children's Learning Garden, which offers Farm Discovery Tours for "students from pre-kindergarten through secondary school" during the school year, and Farm Wonders camps over spring break and in the summer. The garden also hosts the Intergenerational Landed Learning Project, a program run by the UBC Faculty of Education, which partners elementary students, seniors, and other community volunteers to grow food, cook, and learn together throughout the school year.

Future plans for UBC Farm

Construction of two new buildings 

Demand for bigger facilities at the UBC Farm has grown since 2000, and in 2012 it was announced that two new buildings are scheduled for construction at the farm site. The new buildings would include a replacement for the current Farm Centre and a residential sustainability college. The new centre is set to "include classrooms, dry and wet labs, offices, kitchens, processing space, an area for the farmer's market, a small retail space, café and student study spaces", while the college is to offer residential space for students to engage in "practical participation at the Farm".

Possible AMS brewery 

In 2013, the AMS announced that plans for a student-run brewery in the new Student Union Building (SUB), which is set to open in 2014, but had been cancelled for financial reasons. Instead of incorporating the brewery in the new SUB, plans were made to build a commercial student-run brewery at the UBC Farm. However, in UBC's Land Use Plan, no space is assigned to accommodate a brewery on the farm's area.

External links 
 UBC Farm Homepage
 Friends of the UBC Farm Blog
 Vancouver Native Health Society Website
 UBC Faculty of Land & Food Systems

References 

University of British Columbia